Harold Leland Goodwin (November 20, 1914 – February 18, 1990) was an American writer.

Biography and writing career
Known to his friends as Hal Goodwin, Goodwin wrote popular science books, mostly about space exploration, as Harold L. Goodwin, "Hal Goodwin" and "Harold Leland Goodwin". He also wrote children's books as Blake Savage (Rip Foster Rides the Gray Planet) and John Blaine (the Rick Brant series). In the latter case, he co-wrote (with Peter J. Harkins) the first three books in the series and wrote books 4 through 24 by himself.

In 1947, he wrote The Feathered Cape, a boy's adventure novel set in Hawaii. It was based on events leading up to the Battle of the Nu'uanu Valley (1795) in the war for Hawaiian unification.

He had three sons from two different marriages; Alan, Chris and Derek.  He died from cardiac arrest.

References

External links 

 
 
 
 
 
 Interview with Goodwin
  (under 'Goodwin, Harold L. (Harold Leland), 1914–' without '1990', previous page of browse report)
 John Blaine at LC Authorities, with 23 records, and at WorldCat – joint pseudonym "later used solely by Harold Leland Goodwin"

1914 births
1990 deaths
American science fiction writers
American children's writers
20th-century American novelists
American male novelists
20th-century American male writers